Ptarmigan Pass may refer to:
Ptarmigan Pass (British Columbia) – a mountain pass in British Columbia, Canada.
Ptarmigan Pass (Front Range) – a mountain pass on the Continental Divide of the Americas in Rocky Mountain National Park, United States.
Ptarmigan Pass (Sawatch Range) – a mountain pass between Eagle County and Summit County, Colorado, United States.
Ptarmigan Pass (Williams Fork Mountains) – a mountain pass between Grand County and Summit County, Colorado, United States.

See also